St. Munchin's Parish is a civil parish that lies partly in County Clare and partly in County Limerick in Ireland, including the centre of the city of Limerick. It takes its name from Saint Munchin, the first Bishop of Limerick. According to tradition its church was the first cathedral of the diocese of Limerick, built in 561 AD.

Location

The parish lies partly in County Limerick and partly in County Clare.
The parish is divided into two parts by the intervening parishes of St. Nicholas and Killeely.
The part of the city on King's Island is mostly in the parish.

Antiquities
The old church of St. Munchin's is said to have been built in 561, and to have once been the cathedral of the diocese of Limerick.
Saint Munchin, the first Bishop of Limerick, is supposed to have been buried in the churchyard.
According to tradition the church was burned by the Danes. In 1827 a new Anglican church was built, designed by James Pain. This was deconsecrated in 1970 and was used until recently as an exhibition space.

There is an ancient stone near the north end of Thomond bridge called the treaty stone, since this is said to have been where the Treaty of Limerick was signed in 1691.

King's island has the remains of an old Dominican friary. A nunnery was established nearby, and in 1837 the nuns taught girls at no charge in an attached school.
The Church of Ireland built a church in 1827 near the site of the old church with a square tower surmounted by pinnacles.
A layer of ashes was found under the foundation of the old church, which may confirm the story of the earlier burning.
As of 1841 the total population was 4,593 in 537 houses.

Townlands
The parish contains twenty-two townlands. Nine are in the Barony of Bunratty Lower, County Clare, eleven in the North Liberties of the City of Limerick and the remaining two in the Barony of Clanwilliam, County Limerick.

References 
Citations

Sources

 

Civil parishes of County Clare